Yap Khim Wen (born 4 September 1994) is a Malaysian taekwondo practitioner. Yap represented Malaysia at the 2018 Asian Games and she claimed a bronze medal in the women's individual poomsae event. This also became the first medal to be earned by Malaysia during the 2018 Asian Games and also marked the first Asian Games taekwondo medal for Malaysia since the 2002 Asian Games.

References 

1994 births
Living people
Malaysian female taekwondo practitioners
Taekwondo practitioners at the 2018 Asian Games
Medalists at the 2018 Asian Games
Asian Games bronze medalists for Malaysia
Asian Games medalists in taekwondo
People from Selangor
Southeast Asian Games gold medalists for Malaysia
Southeast Asian Games silver medalists for Malaysia
Competitors at the 2015 Southeast Asian Games
Competitors at the 2017 Southeast Asian Games
21st-century Malaysian women